The Findhorn Viaduct is a railway bridge near Forres in Moray, Scotland. Built for the Inverness & Aberdeen Junction Railway between 1856 and 1858 by Joseph Mitchell, with ironwork by William Fairbairn & Sons of Manchester, the viaduct carries the railway line over the River Findhorn approximately 1.7 km west of the town of Forres.

The bridge comprises three box spans of wrought iron, each 150 feet long, at a height of approximately 18 feet above the river. With side spans bridged by arched girders at each end of the viaduct, the total length of the structure is 608.5 feet. It features piers of channeled masonry and ashlar pylons, and bears a cast iron plaque dated 1858.

The Findhorn Viaduct was designated a Category A listed building in 1989.

The viaduct shares its name with another railway bridge crossing the same river, the Findhorn Viaduct near Tomatin, some 14 km south-east of Inverness.

References 

Railway bridges in Scotland
Category A listed buildings in Moray
Viaducts in Scotland